Hermenias pilushina is a moth of the family Tortricidae. It is found in Taiwan.

References

Moths described in 2000
Eucosmini
Moths of Taiwan
Taxa named by Józef Razowski